Elk Spur Branch is a  long 2nd order tributary to Lovills Creek in Carroll County, Virginia.

Course 
Elk Spur Branch rises about 0.5 miles southeast of Fancy Gap, Virginia in Carroll County and then flows south and east-southeast to join Lovills Creek about 4 miles south of Wards Gap.

Watershed 
Elk Spur Branch drains  of area, receives about 54.2 in/year of precipitation, has a wetness index of 265.16, and is about 81% forested.

See also 
 List of Virginia Rivers

References 

Rivers of Carroll County, Virginia
Rivers of Virginia